Stefano Di Berardino (born 11 January 1987) is an Italian professional footballer who play in the role of defender.

Career

Early career
On 30 August 2006, Di Berardino was transferred  to Serie A giants Juventus F.C., where he was sent to the youth system. In exchange, Andrea Luci went to Pescara on loan. He was awarded no. 2 shirt in the second half 2005–06 season, to fill for the vacancy of Nicola Diliso.

Lega Pro
In 2007, Di Berardino graduated from the Juventus youth system, and was soon sold to S.S. Juve Stabia in a co-ownership deal, along with Giuseppe Rizza and Matteo Trini. He made 21 appearances and scored one goal for the club during the 2007–08 Serie C1 season. In June 2008, Juventus bought back Di Berardino for €8,000. For the 2008–09 season, he was once again sent on loan to the Italian Lega Pro Prima Divisione (ex-Serie C1); this time he joined A.C. Pistoiese, where the defender was consistently part of the starting line-up, making, in total, 28 appearances with 1 goal. He returned to Juventus again in the summer of 2009, but was sold to A.S. Pescina Valle del Giovenco in a co-ownership deal. He made just 6 appearances in 5 months, and was loaned to Lega Pro Seconda Divisione club F.C. Pro Vasto, where he has since made 10 league appearances.

In June 2010, Juventus did not extended the co-ownership deal and gave up rest of the player's rights to Valle del Giovenco; however, the club soon went bankrupt, and Di Berardino moved to another Seconda Divisione club, Sacilese. In 2011 he played in the same tournament to Vibo Valentia.

Serie D
Since 2012 he has played in interregional tournaments with the teams of Chiavari, Agnone, Sulmona, Macerata and Celano; in regional tournaments in Avezzano with A.S.D. Pucetta.

References

External links
 

1987 births
People from Avezzano
Living people
Italian footballers
Celano F.C. Marsica players
Juventus F.C. players
S.S. Juve Stabia players
S.S. Maceratese 1922 players
U.S. Pistoiese 1921 players
A.S.D. Sacilese Calcio players
Vastese Calcio 1902 players
U.S. Vibonese Calcio players
Association football defenders
Footballers from Abruzzo
Sportspeople from the Province of L'Aquila